The yellow boxfish (Ostracion cubicum) is a species of boxfish found in reefs throughout the Pacific Ocean and Indian Ocean as well as the southeastern Atlantic Ocean. Recorded occasionally since 2011 in the Levantine waters of the Mediterranean Sea which it likely entered via the Suez Canal, it is a species appreciated in the aquarium trade. 

As the name suggests, it is box-shaped. Boxfish are also known for their armored and rigid body which in most cases would inhibit locomotion. This disadvantage is offset by the boxfish's carapace shape which is much more advantageous for its adapted style of swimming, known as ostraciiform locomotion. When juvenile, it is bright yellow in color. As it ages, the brightness fades and very old specimens have blue-grey to black coloration with faded yellow.

The yellow boxfish's diet consists mainly of marine algae, but it may also feed on worms, sponges, crustaceans, molluscs, and small fish.

When stressed or injured it releases the neurotoxin tetrodotoxin (TTX) from its skin, which may prove lethal to fish in surrounding waters. The bright yellow color and black spots are a form of warning coloration (aposematism) to any potential predators.

Yellow boxfish are solitary animals. Breeding occurs during the spring, in small groups that consist of 1 male and 2–4 females.

In 2006, Mercedes-Benz unveiled its Bionic concept car, which was inspired by the shape of the yellow boxfish. It was assumed that due to the extreme agility with which boxfish maneuver, that their shape was aerodynamic and self-stabilizing. However, analysis by scientists suggests that boxfish agility is instead due to the combination of an aerodynamically unstable body and the manner in which the fish use their fins for movement.

References

External links
 Information, images and videos of the yellow boxfish
 

Ostraciidae
Fish of the Indian Ocean
Fish described in 1758
Taxa named by Carl Linnaeus